The São Paulo Art Biennial (Portuguese: Bienal de São Paulo) was founded in 1951 and has been held every two years since. It is the second oldest art biennial in the world after the Venice Biennale (in existence since 1895), which serves as its role model.

History 
The Biennial was founded by the Italian-Brazilian industrialist Ciccillo Matarazzo (1898–1977). Since 1957, the São Paulo Biennial has been held in the Ciccillo Matarazzo pavilion in the Parque do Ibirapuera. The three-story pavilion was designed by a team led by architects Oscar Niemeyer and Hélio Uchôa, and provides an exhibition space of 30,000 m2. The São Paulo Bienal features both Brazilian and international contemporary art and is considered to be one of the most important large-scale art exhibitions in Brazil and South America.

After completing the 6th Bienal, the Fundação Bienal de São Paulo was created to take the exhibition forward, which until then had been organized (with great success) by the Museu de Arte Moderna de São Paulo (MAM-SP). And the pavilion the institution occupies - its home to this day - only began holding the Bienal exhibitions starting with its 4th edition in 1957. Since 1951, 32 Bienals have been produced with the participation of 170 countries, more than 16 thousand artists and almost 10 million visitors, making direct contact possible between the Brazilian public and the visual, theatrical and graphic arts, music, film, architecture, and other forms of artistic expression from around the world. The 1998 edition cost almost $12 million and drew nearly 400,000 visitors during a two-month run. The 25th biennial was originally scheduled for 2000 but was delayed to 2002 after a gigantic exhibition marking the 500th anniversary of Brazil's discovery by the Portuguese was organized by former biennial president Edemar Cid Ferreira and booked into the Ciccillo Matarazzo pavilion. That year, for the first time, the chief curator of the biennial was a foreigner, Alfons Hug from Germany.

The biennial's initial aim was to make contemporary art (primarily from Western Europe and the United States) known in Brazil, push the country's access to the current art scene in other metropolises, and establish São Paulo itself as an international art center. Naturally, the biennial always serves to bring Brazilian art closer to foreign guests.

Artists, works and countries

Highlights year by year

1st Bienal, 1951 
The first Bienal was held by the Museum of Modern Art of São Paulo (MAM-SP) in a temporary pavilion located on the Belvedere Trianon, in the neighborhood along Paulista Avenue. Abraham Palatnik’s first Aparelho cinecromático (1949) was initially rejected by the selection committee on the grounds that it did not fit any of the established categories, though the work was later accepted and awarded an honorable mention by the international jury.

2nd Bienal, 1953 
Known as the “Guernica Bienal”, in reference to Pablo Picasso’s 1937 masterpiece, the 2nd Bienal is by far one of the most memorable editions of the event. Exhibiting twice as many artworks as the first edition, the 2nd Bienal was held at two pavilions designed for the newly inaugurated Ibirapuera Park by Oscar Niemeyer (1917-2012): the States Pavilion (presently the Pavilion of Brazilian Cultures) and the Nations Pavilion (now home to the Afro Brasil Museum). The exhibition continued into the following year as part of the celebrations for São Paulo's 400th anniversary.

3rd Bienal, 1955 
Having established itself as an important event in international art world, the Bienal's 3rd edition featured the Mexican muralists Diego Rivera, José Clemente Orozco and David Alfaro Siqueiros.

4th Bienal, 1957 
In the 4th Bienal, many Brazilian artists contested the selection process and Ciccillo Matarazzo's inordinate influence. This was the first time the Bienal was held at its present home, the Industry Pavilion at Ibirapuera Park. This edition was surrounded by controversy when works by several leading names in the Brazilian art scene, such as Flávio de Carvalho, were turned down by the selection jury. The abstract expressionist Jackson Pollock, who died the year before, was honoured with a special room organized by the American delegation, which marked the height of his international renown.

5th Bienal, 1959 
200,000 visitors ensured the success of this exhibition, whose highlights included a selection of thirty works by the impressionist icon, Vincent van Gogh, and a strong showing of Tachism and Informal Art.

6th Bienal, 1961 
Ciccillo Matarazzo ceases to be the main patron of the Bienal and the exhibition endured its first financial crisis. The 6th edition is remembered for its museology and the predominance of Neoconcretism, typified by the revolutionary presence of Lygia Clark’s Bichos. Furthermore, part of the selection committee was elected by artists. The Bienal received a delegation from the USSR for the first time in the event’s history.

7th Bienal, 1963 
The 7th edition was marked by an excessive number of works selected, which, in turn, created an eclectic scene that was difficult to understand. This was the first time that Fundação Bienal (founded in 1962) organized the exhibition, instead of the Museum of Modern Art of São Paulo. The catalog was dedicated to Wanda Svevo, who died the previous year.

8th Bienal, 1965 
The Bienal comes under political pressure from the government with the beginning of the military dictatorship in Brazil. At the awards ceremony, artists Maria Bonomi and Sérgio Camargo deliver a motion for the repeal of the preventive arrests of Mário Schenberg, Fernando Henrique Cardoso, Florestan Fernandes and Cruz Costa to the President Castelo Branco. Despite the complications, the exhibition is remembered for a special room dedicated to Surrealism and Fantastic art. Marcel Duchamp’s famous ready-made Roue de bicyclette (1913) was shown alongside works by Max Ernst, Marc Chagall, Joan Miró, Jean Arp, Man Ray, Paul Klee, Paul Delvaux, René Magritte and Francis Picabia.

9th Bienal, 1967 
The “Pop Art Bienal” opened under a shroud of controversy: even before the exhibition opened, the Federal Police removed two works on the grounds that they were “offensive” to the Brazilian Constitution: Cybèle Varela’s painting O presente was considered “anti-nationalist” – the work was destroyed and the artist almost arrested by the DOPS – and the series by Quissak Jr., Meditação sobre a Bandeira Nacional, which infringed laws that prohibited the free use of the flag. The US delegation presented a sample of Pop Art that included Jasper Johns, Andy Warhol, Roy Lichtenstein and Robert Rauschenberg. Many works were damaged and the US room was vandalized a few days into the exhibition. From this show on, the award jury was composed of art critics rather than consultants.

10th Bienal, 1969 
Months after Institutional Act n. 5 (AI-5) came into force, effectively annulling personal freedoms, eighty percent of the artists invited to exhibition refused, in protest, to participate. The 10th edition was thus nicknamed the “Boycott Bienal”

11th Bienal, 1971 
Controversy surrounded the opening of the Bienal with the boycott by artists, again, and the exile of Mario Pedrosa, who had been a leader for most of the editions in the Bienal's first decade, and director of the 6th and 7th editions. The selection of Brazilian artists was made from a pre-Bienal held the previous year.

12th Bienal, 1973 
A giant mouth designed by Vera Figueiredo "swallowed" visitors to 12th Bienal, demonstrating the strength of Neo-concrete derivations. Installations and environments that appealed to all of the senses were presented in the Art and Communication segment. Replacing the Art Technical Committee, the Council for Art and Culture (CAC) developed a new selection framework and denied entry to 90% of the Brazilian works submitted. The Brazilian Representation was made up of 100 artists selected through regional juries (Fortaleza, Salvador, Belo Horizonte, Rio de Janeiro, São Paulo, Curitiba). Kandinsky's works, which were brought by the French Representation, are exhibited for the first time in South America.

13th Bienal, 1975 
Eager for updating, the so-called "Videomakers Bienal" brought Brazil a precise selection video art produced by renowned artists from all parts of the world, ranging from Andy Warhol to South Korean Nam June Paik, whose installation TV Garden (1974) surprised the Brazilian audience by arranging TV monitors among vases of Palm trees and artificial plants.

14th Bienal, 1977 
The first Bienal without Ciccillo was defined by meaningful changes: the appointment of a Council for Art and Culture with freedom to develop the exhibition program – among the new rules is the requirement that National Representations follow the themes proposed by the Bienal for the selection of artists, a model inspired by the Venice Biennale. The CAC defines three chapters for the exhibition: Anthological Exhibitions (replacing the Special Rooms), Great Confrontations and Contemporary Propositions – the latter composed of seven themes: Urban Archaeology, Nature Recuperation, Catastrophic Art, Video Art, Space Poetry, The Wall as a Display for Artworks, Non Codified Art. For the first time in its history, the Grand Prize "Itamaraty" was awarded to a Latin American artist, the Argentine Grupo CAYC of the Centro de Arte y Comunicación in Buenos Aires.

15th Bienal, 1979 
The "Bienal of the Bienals" was a retrospective of the previous fourteen editions and brought national and international prize-winning works since 1951 back to the pavilion, as well as artists selected by the Brazilian Association of Art Critics (ABCA). On the other hand, it was the first Bienal not to grant any awards, a strategy that would continue on definitively in the following editions.

16th Bienal, 1981 
The emergence of the General Curator role would change the course of the Bienal. The critic and former Director of the Museum of Contemporary Art of the University of São Paulo (MAC-USP), Walter Zanini, was the first to fill the position, in an edition which abolished separate spaces for each country and chose to group the works according to "analogy of language" (techniques and themes). This show also marks the end of the boycotts of the Bienal by artists and the beginning of political openness in Brazil.

17th Bienal, 1983 
The increasingly common languages in contemporary global art of performance, video, videotext, installation and happening set the tone of the 17th Bienal. Fluxus Street was installed on the ground floor of the pavilion and was one of the most memorable installations. It even included a room with documentation on the group – records of Ben Vautier sleeping, Dick Higgins playing the piano, and Wolf Vostell during an action in New York.

18th Bienal, 1985 
This edition showed the rising trend of expressionism in contemporary painting and featured an unusual expography that set the debate through the course of the entire 18th Bienal. The curator, Sheila Leirner, arranged most of the works in three 100-meter long halls, installing paintings side by side – a display called the Great Canvas.

19th Bienal, 1987 
Adopting “Utopia versus Reality” as its theme, the 19th Bienal's highlights were the works by German artist Anselm Kiefer. Marked by a strong presence of installations and sculptures, the third floor of the pavilion received the monumental sculpture, Palette mit Flügel (1985), by Kiefer, and the installation Enquanto flora a borda... (1987), by Tunga, which would slide from the ceiling to the floor in the large central span of the pavilion.

20th Bienal, 1989 
The 20th Bienal was conceived by a triumvirate: Carlos von Schmidt, Stella Teixeira de Barros, and João Cândido Galvão. Interrupting the propositions of past editions, the team resumed the granting of awards and the arrangement of national representations in separate rooms. The Brazilian Representation was considered to be one of the most solid in a long time.

21st Bienal, 1991 
Only for this edition did the Bienal resume the system of open registration for artists from all over the world. Heading the curatorship, João Cândido Galvão repeated his role in the previous edition as curator of the dance, music and theater sections, and enjoyed success by presenting two unforgettable performances: Suz/O/Suz, by the Catalan group Fura dels Baus, and O Trilogie Antica: Medeea, Troienele, Electra, by Henrik Ibsen, narrated in Latin and Greek by the National Theater Company of Bucharest.

22nd Bienal, 1994 
The Bienal changes its calendar and starts taking place in even-numbered years. The historical segment takes on a major importance in this edition, whose theme, “Rupture as Support,” made it possible to explore platforms and poetics observed in the works of Hélio Oiticica, Lygia Clark and Mira Schendel.

23rd Bienal, 1996 
A new record in the number of national representations with 75 countries subscribing to the theme proposed by Nelson Aguilar: “The Dematerialization of Art at the End of the Millennium.” On this occasion, a Historical Nucleus with a broad diversity of countries brought together over 200 prints by Francisco de Goya, illustrated the posthumous work of Jean-Michael Basquiat, and presented 37 paintings by Edvard Munch.

24th Bienal, 1998 
Known as one of the best edition ever produced, the "Anthropophagy Bienal" was led by Paulo Herkenhoff as general curator and Adriano Pedrosa as associate curator. The concept, extracted from the roots of Brazilian culture, permeated the work of all 76 curators involved in the exhibition, as well as was the result of powerful solo shows dedicated to each of the 53 National Representations. The curators worked with the idea of contamination and put contemporary Brazilian works in dialogue with works in the Historical Nucleus.

25th Bienal, 2002 
Centered on the theme “Metropolitan Iconographies”, the 25th Bienal has become famous for the strong presence of Brazilian artists off the São Paulo/Rio de Janeiro axis. The appointment of the first foreign curator, Alfons Hug, from Germany, excited controversy. However, the show received excellent acclaim and beat attendance records, at 668,428 visitors.

Taiwan controversy 

During the event, the title of Taiwan's national pavilion was changed overnight read "Museum of Fine Arts, Taipei". This was revealed to had been caused by the Chinese government, who had threatened to pull their own artists out of the event. In protest Chien-Chi Chang, the artist chosen to represent Taiwan at the Biennial, closed their installation. Austrian group Monochrom, who were running the neighbouring pavilion, invited other artists to donate letters from their own country titles in order to recreate the word "Taiwan". Although they were successful, this too was taken down.

26th Bienal, 2004 
This was the first year of the free admission policy, which would be applied to all subsequent editions. With the theme of “Free Territory,” the 26th Bienal, introduced a new generation into the art scene, such as Cabelo, Chelpa Ferro and Laura Vinci, among others. Once again the exhibition demonstrated its highly contemporary character by presenting works mostly produced between 2002 and 2004. At least one third of the works in the show were site-specific projects, developed specifically for the Bienal Pavilion.

27th Bienal, 2006 
The theme “How to Live Together” – the title of a set of seminars delivered by Roland Barthes in the 1970s – served curator Lisette Lagnado as a guide. The edition was marked by the extinction of National Representations – the selection of artists was up to the determination of the curators of the Bienals – and by the claim that art is a transnational language. Constituting a fundamental innovation for the exhibition, the curatorial projects would be chosen from then on through a selection process conducted by an international committee of critics and curators.

28th Bienal, 2008 
Rethinking the purpose and direction of the exhibition, the 28th Bienal – “In Living Contact” carried out a radical proposal by keeping the second floor of the pavilion completely empty, as an Open Plan – a metaphor for the conceptual crisis experienced by traditional biennial systems faced by the institutions that organize them. The noteworthy episode of that edition was the graffiti on the pavilion's guardrails, which led to a discussion in the art milieu about urban art.

29th Bienal, 2010 
Driven by a new impetus promoted by a new board of directors committed to the renewal of the institution, the Bienal inaugurated its 29th edition with a permanent educational project and a broad parallel program. Favoring politically oriented works, the curatorship of Agnaldo Farias and Moacir dos Anjos held nearly 400 activities in the six conceptual spaces entitled Terreiros, and made its theme a verse by Jorge de Lima: “There is always a cup of sea to sail in”. Bandeira branca (2010), by Nuno Ramos, stirred controversy due to its live vultures flying in the central span of the pavilion accompanied by a montage of sounds from the national popular tradition.

30th Bienal, 2012 
Titled “The Imminence of Poetics”, this edition of the Bienal adopted the constellation as a metaphor and established discursive interconnections between past and present; center and periphery; object and language. With a large number of works by each artist, the exhibition focused on Latin American artists and paid tribute to Arthur Bispo do Rosário and Waldemar Cordeiro. The project Mobile Radio set up a radio station on the mezzanine floor of the pavilion that had broadcasts throughout the entire period of the exhibition. The Biennial featured the largest corpus of works by Alair Gomes ever shown, the entire portfolio People of the XXth Century by August Sander and for the first time in the Americas the entire Alphabet Bété by Frédéric Bruly-Bouabré, among 119 artists represented within the Matarazzo Pavilion and other institutions throughout the city of São Paulo.

31st Bienal, 2014 
The works of this edition – entitled “How to (…) things that don’t exist” – were designed within the concept of "project," many carried out in collaboration between two or more individuals – artists and professionals from other disciplines, such as teachers, sociologists, architects or writers. Daring, the exhibition established itself as being deeply connected with some central themes of contemporary life: identity, sexuality and transcendence.

32nd Bienal, 2016 
The 32nd Bienal – “Live Uncertainty” set itself the aim of observing notions of uncertainty and strategies offered by contemporary art to embrace or inhabit it. Established artists like Öyvind Fahlström, Sonia Andrade, Lourdes Castro and Víctor Grippo were seen alongside young artists, most of whom were women. Also noteworthy is the fact that this edition was the one that presented the highest number of commissioned artworks in the history of the exhibition. The curators traveled to four cities to bring forth Study Days (Accra, in Ghana, Lamas, in Peru, Santiago, in Chile, and Cuiabá, in Brazil), and also held a last meeting in São Paulo. Conceived as an artwork by Jorge Menna Barreto, the exhibition's restaurant unfolds notions regarding the relationships between human eating habits and the environment, landscape, climate and life on Earth.

33rd Bienal, 2018 

The 33rd Bienal – “Affective Affinities” was held from September 7 to December 9.

34th Bienal, 2020/2021 
Due to the COVID-19 pandemic, most events were for this year were postponed to September 4 through December 5, 2021, with future Bienales being in odd-numbered years. The theme is "Though it’s dark, still I sing".

See also 
 Bienal Brasileira de Artes Plásticas
 Brazilian art

References

External links
 Bienal de São Paulo homepage Website
 Bienal Brasileira de Artes Plásticas Website
 Artkrush.com - feature on São Paulo Biennial, November 2006

Arts festivals in Brazil
Art biennials
1951 in art
1951 establishments in Brazil
Tourist attractions in São Paulo
Festivals in São Paulo
Art festivals in Brazil